The 2005 Town of Bedford municipal election took place on November 6, 2005, to elect a mayor and councillors in the town of Bedford, Quebec. All members of council were returned without opposition.

Results

Source: Élections municipales 2005, Affairs municipales, Régions, et Occupation du Territoire.

References

2005 Quebec municipal elections